× Epicattleya (from Cattleya and Epidendrum, its parent genera) is an intergeneric orchid hybrid. The nothogenus is abbreviated Epc. in the horticultural trade.

References

Orchid nothogenera
Laeliinae